C-X-C motif chemokine 5 (CXCL5 or ENA78) is a protein that in humans is encoded by the CXCL5 gene.

Function 

The protein encoded by this gene, CXCL5 is a small cytokine belonging to the CXC chemokine family that is also known as epithelial-derived neutrophil-activating peptide 78 (ENA-78).  It is produced following stimulation of cells with the inflammatory cytokines interleukin-1 or tumor necrosis factor-alpha. Expression of CXCL5 has also been observed in eosinophils, and can be inhibited with the type II interferon IFN-γ. This chemokine stimulates the chemotaxis of neutrophils possessing angiogenic properties.  It elicits these effects by interacting with the cell surface chemokine receptor CXCR2. The gene for CXCL5 has four exons and is located on human chromosome 4 amongst several other CXC chemokine genes. CXCL5 has been implicated in connective tissue remodelling. CXCL5 has been also described to regulate neutrophil homeostasis.

Clinical significance 

CXCL5 plays a role in reducing sensitivity to sunburn pain in some subjects, and is a "potential target which can be utilized to understand more about pain in other inflammatory conditions like arthritis and cystitis.". CXCL5 is well known to have chemotactic and activating functions on neutrophil, mainly during acute inflammatory responses. However CXCL5 expression is also higher in atherosclerosis (a chronic inflammatory condition) but is not associated with neutrophil infiltration. Instead CXCL5 has a protective role in atherosclerosis by directly controlling macrophage foam cell formation.

References

External links

Further reading

Cytokines